The Minister of State for National Security in the President’s Office was a non-cabinet ministerial position in the government of Zimbabwe. Notable ministers have included Didymus Mutasa, Nicholas Goche, and Emmerson Mnangagwa. The minister oversaw the Central Intelligence Organisation (CIO). But literally it is the CIO that controls the ministry since they say the Minister is a political appointee.

The ministry was merged with the Ministry of Defence on 30 November 2017 to become the Ministry of Defence, Security and War Veterans.

List of ministers
Emmerson Mnangagwa (1980–88) as Minister of State for National Security in the President's Office
unknown
Nicholas Goche (2000–05) as Minister of State for National Security
Didymus Mutasa (2005–09) as Minister of State for National Security, Lands, Land Reform and Resettlement in the President's Office
Sydney Sekeramayi (2009–13) as Minister of State for National Security in the President's Office
Kembo Mohadi (2015–17) as Minister of State for National Security in the President's Office
Owen Ncube (2018–22)

References

 Part One of the leaked Zim CIO list - SW Radio Africa News

Government of Zimbabwe